Adventure is a documentary television series that aired on CBS beginning in 1953.  The series was produced in collaboration with the American Museum of Natural History and hosted by Charles Collingwood.  The program consisted of interviews with scientists and academicians and films of anthropological expeditions.

Individuals appearing in interviews included historian Bernard DeVoto, biologist Alexander Fleming, and adventurer Sasha Siemel.

Marcel LaFollette has written, "Production approaches that are now standard practice on NOVA and the Discovery Channel derive, in fact, from experimentation by television pioneers like Lynn Poole and Don Herbert and such programs as Adventure, Zoo Parade, Science in Action, and the Bell Telephone System's science specials. These early efforts were also influenced by television's love of the dramatic, refined during its first decade and continuing to shape news and public affairs programming, as well as fiction and fantasy, today." LaFollette included the program in her 2008 overview of early broadcasting devoted to science popularization.

Broadcast history
The show began its run in May 1953 and was broadcast on late Sunday afternoon.  It switched to early Sunday evening (6:00 pm to 7:00 pm) in June 1953.  In October 1953, it returned to Sunday afternoon and remained there through July 1956.

References

External links

1953 American television series debuts
1956 American television series endings
American educational television series
Black-and-white American television shows
CBS original programming
English-language television shows
Science education television series